James Bieri (born 1927) is a psychologist and biographer who introduced in 1955 the concept of cognitive complexity, derived from his doctoral study with George A. Kelly. Subsequently, integrating ideas from information theory and psychophysics, Bieri and his research team at Columbia University published a volume entitled Clinical and Social Judgment (John Wiley, 1966).

After serving in the U.S. Navy, Bieri obtained his undergraduate degree from Antioch College (1950) and his Ph.D. at Ohio State University (1953). He held teaching positions at Harvard University (Department of Social Relations), Columbia University (School of Social Work), City University of New York (Brooklyn College), and the University of Texas at Austin, where he was Professor and Director of the Clinical Psychology Training Program.

Upon retirement, Bieri pursued his interest in English Romantic poetry and in 2005 published a two-volume biography of Percy Bysshe Shelley (University of Delaware Press, 2004 & 2005). A second edition of this work was published in 2008 by Johns Hopkins University Press, Baltimore.

References

21st-century American psychologists
Ohio State University alumni
Harvard University faculty
Columbia University faculty
University of Texas at Austin faculty
Living people
1927 births
Brooklyn College faculty
20th-century American psychologists